Isaac Lawrence Milliken (August 29, 1813December 2, 1889) served as mayor of Chicago, Illinois from 1854 to 1855. He was a member of the Democratic Party.

Born in Saco, Maine, Milliken moved to Chicago in 1837 and set up a blacksmith shop on Randolph Street. Here, Milliken taught himself law and was twice elected alderman and appointed an assistant county judge.

In the election of 1854, Milliken defeated Amos Gaylord Throop, who ran on the Temperance Party ticket, with nearly 60% of the vote. Although Throop was the temperance candidate, after winning the election, Milliken declared himself in favor of temperance as well. He ran for re-election the following year against Levi Boone, of the American Party and lost with 47% of the vote.

Following his term as mayor, Milliken stayed in public service, becoming a police magistrate.

He died at his home in Chicago on December 2, 1889, and was buried at Rosehill Cemetery.

References

External links
Inaugural Address
Milliken biography page at Chicago Public Library

1813 births
1889 deaths
Burials at Rosehill Cemetery
Mayors of Chicago
Chicago City Council members
Illinois state court judges
19th-century American politicians
People from Saco, Maine
Illinois Democrats
19th-century American judges
Milliken family